Trox cretaceus is an extinct species of hide beetle in the subfamily Troginae.

References

cretaceus
Beetles described in 2007